Deakin Alexander Hall (1884–1957) was a politician from Saskatchewan, Canada.

Deakin was a long-standing member of the Legislative Assembly of Saskatchewan serving for the Saskatchewan Liberal Party from 1913 to 1944.

External links
Saskatchewan Legislative Assembly Members, Saskatchewan Archives

1884 births
1957 deaths
Saskatchewan Liberal Party MLAs
20th-century Canadian legislators